Comrade is a Bengali drama film directed by former Trinamul Congress student leader Shankudeb Panda. This film was released on 21 July 2017. The music is released by Amara Muzik.

Plot
The story based on the Singur - Nandigram violence which took place in the period of 2006 to 2007 in West Bengal. A peasants movement starts against land acquisition policy by the Government for industrialisation. The government stick on the point to acquire lands for a factory. Party workers confront with the farmers on the issue. Two women, Nandini and Radharani become the leader of the uprising. Nandini is gang-raped and murdered and Radharani commits suicide. Those horrific incidents make villagers to more united for their rights. Later Supreme Court of India orders to stop the land acquisition.

Cast
 Kharaj Mukherjee
 Ena Saha
 Moubani Sorcar
 Bhaswar Chattopadhyay
 Anindya Banerjee
 Prasun Gain
 Mainak Banerjee
 Rajarshi Sengupta

Production
The film is produced by Aatreyee Nirman Easel. Kharaj Mukherjee is playing a key role. The shooting is mainly done in various places of South and North Bengal, including Garhbeta, Singur and Kolkata. The music is composed by Surojit Chatterjee.

References

2017 films
Bengali-language Indian films
2010s Bengali-language films
Indian drama films
2017 drama films
Indian films based on actual events